Yang Chun-han, born 1 January 1997, is a Taiwanese athlete of Amis descent specialising in sprinting events. He won two medals at the 2017 Asian Championships, gold in the 200 and bronze in the 100 metres. Yang won gold in the 100 metres at the 2017 Summer Universiade. He holds the national records in both the 100 and 200 metres.

International competitions

Personal bests
100 metres – 10.11 (W：+0.2 m/s, Hiratsuka 2018) NR
200 metres – 20.23 (W：+0.7 m/s, Jakarta 2018) NR

References

1997 births
Living people
Taiwanese male sprinters
Athletes (track and field) at the 2014 Summer Youth Olympics
Athletes (track and field) at the 2014 Asian Games
Athletes (track and field) at the 2018 Asian Games
Athletes (track and field) at the 2020 Summer Olympics
Olympic athletes of Taiwan
Asian Games medalists in athletics (track and field)
Asian Games silver medalists for Chinese Taipei
Medalists at the 2018 Asian Games
Amis people
Universiade medalists in athletics (track and field)
Universiade gold medalists for Chinese Taipei
Universiade bronze medalists for Chinese Taipei
Medalists at the 2017 Summer Universiade
Competitors at the 2015 Summer Universiade
Competitors at the 2019 Summer Universiade